Nikolina Knežević (born 2 July 2000) is a Montenegrin handball player for CSU Danubius Galați and the Montenegrin national team.

She represented Montenegro at the 2019 World Women's Handball Championship.

References

External links

Montenegrin female handball players
2000 births
Living people
Sportspeople from Podgorica
Mediterranean Games medalists in handball
Mediterranean Games silver medalists for Montenegro
Competitors at the 2018 Mediterranean Games